Hop Harrigan (aka Hop Harrigan America's Ace of the Airways) (1946) is a Columbia film serial, based on the Hop Harrigan comic books by DC Comics. The serial comprised 15 two-reel chapters with Derwin Abrahams as the director, and Sam Katzman, the producer. Columbia Pictures was one of the last Hollywood studios to continue in postwar years with the serial format. By 1947, Universal Pictures discontinued their serials, with only Republic Pictures and Columbia continuing with serials. The last serial was Columbia's Blazing the Overland Trail (1956).

Plot
Hop Harrigan (William Bakewell), a top Air Corps pilot, leaves the military and he and his mechanic, "Tank" Tinker (Sumner Getchell), open up a small charter air service. They are hired by J. Westly Arnold (Emmett Vogan) to fly an inventor, Dr. Tobor (John Merton), to his secret laboratory, where he is working on a new and powerful energy machine.

A mysterious villain named "The Chief Pilot" (Wheeler Oakman), however, is also determined to have the new energy machine for his own purposes. He uses a destructive raygun to cripple Hop's aircraft and kidnaps Dr. Tobor. Hop and Tank, aided by Gail Nolan (Jennifer Holt) and her younger brother, Jackie (Robert "Buzz" Henry), finally overcome the criminals only find a bigger threat to them all within their group.

Dr. Tobor is insane and has a hideous plan to destroy the earth. Only Hop can stop him.

Chapter titles

 A Mad Mission
 The Secret Ray
 The Mystery Plane
 Plunging Peril
 Betrayed by a Madman
 A Flaming Trap
 One Chance for Life
 White Fumes of Fate
 Dr. Tobor's Revenge
 Juggernaut of Fate
 Flying to Oblivion
 Lost in the Skies
 No Escape
 The Chute that Failed
 The Fate of the World

Cast

 William Bakewell as Hop Harrigan 
 Jennifer Holt as Gail Nolan
 Robert 'Buzz' Henry as Jackie Nolan
 Sumner Getchell as "Tank" Tinker
 Emmett Vogan as J. Westly Arnold
 Claire James as Gwen Arnold
 John Merton as Dr. Tobor
 Wheeler Oakman as Alex Ballard/The Chief Pilot
 Ernie Adams as Retner
 Peter Michael as Mark Craven
 Terry Frost as Barry
 Anthony Warde as Edwards
 Jackie Moran as Fraser
 Bobby Stone as Gray
 Jack Buchanon as Deputy Sheriff

Production
Hop Harrigan was based on Jon l. Blummer's All-American Comics and associated radio series. The serial featured location shooting at an airport, but relied heavily on studio sets. The aircraft in Hop Harrigan included a Boeing-Stearman Kaydet, Bellanca Cruisair and a Stinson Junior.

Reception
Author and film critic, Andrew C. Cline wrote in In the Nick of Time (1984) that Hop Harrigan is "... a fairly action-filled cliffhanger...[and the] action was well paced, making this chapterplay as convincing and successful as it was meant to be."

See also
 List of film serials by year
 List of film serials by studio

References

Notes

Citations

Bibliography

 Cline, William C. "Chapter 3. The Six Faces of Adventure", In the Nick of Time. Jefferson, North Carolina: McFarland & Company, Inc., 1984, .
 Farmer, James H. Celluloid Wings: The Impact of Movies on Aviation (1st ed.). Blue Ridge Summit, Pennsylvania: TAB Books 1984. .
 Rainey, Buck. Serials and Series: A World Filmography, 1912–1956. Jefferson, North Carolina: McFarland & Company, Inc., 2010. . 
 Weiss, Ken and Ed Goodgold. To be Continued ...: A Complete Guide to Motion Picture Serials. New York: Bonanza Books, 1973. .

External links
 
 
 
 

1946 films
American aviation films
1940s English-language films
1940s superhero films
American black-and-white films
1946 adventure films
Columbia Pictures film serials
Live-action films based on DC Comics
American adventure films
Films with screenplays by George H. Plympton
Films directed by Derwin Abrahams
1940s American films
Films based on DC Comics